Petalacte is a genus of flowering plants in the family Asteraceae.

Species
There is only one known species, Petalacte coronata, endemic to South Africa.

References

Gnaphalieae
Monotypic Asteraceae genera
Endemic flora of South Africa